The 1990 NBL Finals was the championship series of the 1990 season of Australia's National Basketball League (NBL) and the conclusion of the season's playoffs. The Perth Wildcats defeated the Brisbane Bullets in three games (2-1) for their first NBL championship.

Format
The 1990 National Basketball League Finals started on 26 September and concluded on 28 October. The playoffs consisted of two best of three Elimination finals, two best of three Semi-finals and the best of three game Grand Final series. As the two top teams at the end of the regular season, the North Melbourne Giants and Eastside Spectres both qualified for home court advantage during the Semi-finals.

Qualification

Qualified teams

Ladder

The NBL tie-breaker system as outlined in the NBL Rules and Regulations states that in the case of an identical win–loss record, the results in games played between the teams will determine order of seeding.

1Head-to-Head between Eastside Spectres and Brisbane Bullets (1-1). Eastside Spectres won For and Against (+7). 

2Head-to-Head between Melbourne Tigers and Perth Wildcats (1-1). Melbourne Tigers won For and Against (+11).

3Sydney Kings won Head-to-Head (2-0).

Elimination finals

(4) Perth Wildcats vs (5) Melbourne Tigers

Game 1

Game 2

(3) Brisbane Bullets vs (6) Sydney Kings

Game 1

Game 2

Game 3

Semi-finals

(2) Eastside Spectres vs (3) Brisbane Bullets

Game 1

Game 2

(1) North Melbourne Giants vs (4) Perth Wildcats

Game 1

Game 2

Game 3

Grand Final series
The 1990 Grand Final series between the Brisbane Bullets and Perth Wildcats saw a then record aggregate attendance for an NBL Grand Final series with 34,580 attending the 3 games. Game 2 at the Brisbane Entertainment Centre attracted a then record Australian indoor sporting attendance (and NBL record crowd) of 13,221.

(3) Brisbane Bullets vs (4) Perth Wildcats

Game 1

Game 2

Game 3

See also
 1990 NBL season

References

Finals
National Basketball League (Australia) Finals